Válber Roel de Oliveira, simply known as Válber (born 31 March 1967 in Rio de Janeiro), is a former association footballer who played primarily as centre back. He played for the Brazil national team and played for several Brasileirão Série A clubs. He won the Copa Libertadores twice in his career with two different teams, first with Sao Paulo in the 1993 Copa Libertadores & with Vasco da Gama in the 1998 Copa Libertadores.

Honours

Clubs
São Paulo
Copa Libertadores (1): 1993
Intercontinental Cup (2): 1992, 1993
Recopa Sudamericana (2): 1993, 1994
Supercopa Sudamericana (1): 1993
Campeonato Paulista (1): 1992

Flamengo
Campeonato Carioca (1): 1996

Vasco da Gama
Brazilian League (1): 1997
Copa Libertadores (1): 1998
Campeonato Carioca (1): 1998

Fluminense
Brazilian League C (1): 1999

References

External links
 Flapédia profile
 Lancenet! profile

Footballers from Rio de Janeiro (city)
1967 births
Living people
Brazilian footballers
Brazilian football managers
Campeonato Brasileiro Série A players
Brazil international footballers
1993 Copa América players
São Cristóvão de Futebol e Regatas players
Fluminense FC players
Botafogo de Futebol e Regatas players
São Paulo FC players
CR Flamengo footballers
CR Vasco da Gama players
Coritiba Foot Ball Club players 
Santos FC players
Associação Atlética Internacional (Limeira) players
Barretos Esporte Clube players
America Football Club (RJ) players
Audax Rio de Janeiro Esporte Clube managers
Association football defenders 
 Association football midfielders